Presidential elections under the Estado Novo regime was held for the last time on 25 July 1972, the only one not controlled by late Prime Minister António de Oliveira Salazar, with the last elections for the National Assembly held the following year, less than a year before the Carnation Revolution. Incumbent President and former Naval Minister Américo Thomaz of the ruling People's National Action was endorsed by a uniform National Assembly for a third seven-year term, which would have ended on 25 July 1979.

Results

References

Portugal
1972 in Portugal
Presidential elections in Portugal
July 1972 events in Europe